Viliam is a given name. Notable people with the name include:

Viliam Amersek or Vili Ameršek (born 1948), retired Slovenian football player
Viliam Figuš-Bystrý (born Viliam Figuš) (1875–1937), Slovak composer, teacher, author of the first Slovak national opera Detvan
Viliam Hýravý (born 1962), Slovak football player
Viliam Judák (9 November 1959) is the Diocesan Bishop of Nitra, Slovakia
Viliam König (1903–1973), Czech football manager and former player
Viliam Loviska (born 1964), Slovak sculptor, painter, designer, educator and organiser of the cultural life
Viliam Macko (born 1981), Slovak football player
Viliam Schrojf (1931–2007), former Slovak football goalkeeper
Viliam Široký (1902–1971), Communist politician of Czechoslovakia, the Prime Minister from 1953 to 1963
Viliam Tvrský (1880–1943), fencer

See also
William (disambiguation)
Viliame (disambiguation)
Viliamu